Jalil Hanoon Motar Al-Asadi (born 1952) is an Iraqi former footballer who is the president of Al-Minaa club.

Sport history
Jalil Hanoon played as a forward and spent the majority of his career with Al-Minaa club, He was capped Iraqi League title for Al-Minaa, winning the title of the top scorer 1978, and appeared at the World Military Cup 1977, and scored a goal in Nigeria's nets. He also played matches in Pestabola Merdeka 1977 in Malaysia. Hanoon was highly regarded throughout his the top scorer of the particular model, has scored during him sports-old 271 goals at the level of local matches and 7 goals in 37 international matches. and sports fans were calls him: (Keegan of Iraq). Hanoon is the only scorer for Al-Minaa club in the Iraqi league so far, when he scored 11 goals in the 1977-78 season. He is the only player in the league who scored a hat-trick in the nets of two mass clubs (Al-Tayaran & Al-Zawraa) in the 1983-84 season. He is also the second player who has scored 5 goals in one match in the Iraqi league while shook nets of Al-Hillah in 1977 season.
Jalil's brother is athletic too, he is his coach, he's the player and coach Jamil Hanoon, a coach who guided Al-Minaa club to win the league title in 1977-78 season.

International career
On August 21, 1973 Jalil Hanoon played his debut with Iraq against South Yemen in fully international match, in the 2nd edition of Palestine Cup of Nations in Libya, scoring his first goal in this match which ended 2-0 for Iraq.

On March 28, 1980 Jalil Hanoon played his last international match with Iraq against South Yemen too, within qualifier of Moscow Olympics in Baghdad, which ended 3-0 for Iraq.

International goals
Iraq national football team goals
Scores and results list Iraq's goal tally first.

Honors

Local
Al-Mina'a
 1978 Iraqi League: Champion

International
Iraq
 1977 World Men's Military Cup: Champion
 1977 Pestabola Merdeka: runner-up

References

External links
List of Iraqi Topscorers at rsssf.com
Al-Minaa Club: Sailors of south

1952 births
Living people
Association football forwards
Iraqi footballers
Al-Mina'a SC players
Al-Bahri players
Sportspeople from Basra
Iraq international footballers
1976 AFC Asian Cup players
Iraqi football managers